Meinert is an unincorporated community in Dade County, in the U.S. state of Missouri.

History
A post office called Meinert was established in 1890, and remained in operation until 1907. The community has the name of the original owner of the town site.

References

Unincorporated communities in Dade County, Missouri
Unincorporated communities in Missouri